Vallabhaneni Balasouri (born 18 September 1968) is an Indian politician from the YSR Congress Party. He is the current Member of Parliament (MP) in the 17th Lok Sabha representing Machilipatnam parliamentary constituency. He also served as the Member of Parliament in the 14th Lok Sabha from Tenali constituency.

Political career 
Balasouri contested and won 2004 Lok Sabha elections as a Congress candidate from Tenali constituency with 54.47% of votes polled and a 78,556 majority over the incumbent Telugu Desam Party's Ummareddy Venkateswarlu. He served as the MP until the constituency was abolished in 2008 and merged into Guntur constituency.

He later contested and won 2019 Lok Sabha elections as a YSR Congress Party candidate from Machilipatnam constituency with 46.02% of votes polled and a 60,141 majority over the incumbent Telugu Desam Party's Konakalla Narayana Rao.

Filmography
 Vallabhaneni produced the 2004 film Letha Manasulu, directed by S. V. Krishna Reddy.

References

http://164.100.47.194/Loksabha/Members/MemberBioprofile.aspx?mpsno=4021

External links
 Official biographical sketch in Parliament of India website

1968 births
Living people
India MPs 2019–present
India MPs 2004–2009
Lok Sabha members from Andhra Pradesh
People from Guntur district
YSR Congress Party politicians
Indian National Congress politicians from Andhra Pradesh
Telugu politicians